Benoît Paire (born 8 May 1989) is a French professional tennis player.

His best result in a Grand Slam has been reaching the fourth round, which he has achieved on four occasions. He has won three singles titles, at the 2015 Swedish Open, the 2019 Marrakesh Open and the 2019 Lyon Open, and his career-high singles ranking is World No. 18, first achieved in January 2016. He has a career-high ranking of World No. 65 in doubles achieved on 15 November 2021.

In 2015, Paire was voted Comeback Player of the Year, rising from world No. 118 ATP singles ranking at year-end 2014 to a then career-high world No. 19 at year-end 2015, after a knee injury had sidelined him for much of 2014.

Career

2007–09: Early career
In 2007, Paire played his tennis at Futures level, winning one event (the France F10).
In 2008, Paire continued to play primarily on the Futures circuit, but made his first appearances in higher-tier tournaments, losing in the qualifying rounds at the Open 13 and the Open Sud de France, both part of the ATP 250 Series. Similarly, Benoît made it to the main draw for the first time at Challenger level at Alessandria. Paire played in his first Grand Slam tournament, at the French Open, receiving a wildcard in the qualifying draw but lost in the first round.

In 2009, Paire began playing more Challenger tournaments, but at Futures level won the Slovenia F3 and lost in three other finals in the space of three months. Again that year, he received a wildcard into the French Open qualifying draw, this time making it into the final qualifying round, before losing to Fabio Fognini.

2010: First Challenger final, Masters debut

In 2010, Paire played most of his tennis at Challenger level, reaching his first Challenger final at Arad in July, where he lost to fellow countryman David Guez.

Paire still played many Futures tournaments, making it to six finals (winning three). However, Benoît began making a lot of progress at the ATP level, receiving a wildcard into the Open Sud de France before losing in the first round to John Isner and getting through qualifying in Valencia again before losing in the first round. Paire played his first ATP Masters event in Paris, losing in qualifying.

For the first time, Paire made it to the second round of a Grand Slam, coming through qualifying and beating Rainer Schüttler before losing to big-serving Feliciano López in five sets at the US Open. This success came after a first-round defeat at Roland Garros for the second time in his career (again after coming through qualifying), as well as a first-round loss in qualifying at Wimbledon.

2011: Top 100 debut

2011 was Paire's most successful year to date, making more ATP main draw appearances than the rest of his career put together. It was a year in which he increased his ranking around sixty places and broke into the top 100 in the ATP rankings for the first time in his career. Paire also appeared in the main draw in three of the four Grand Slams (and for the first time without needing to qualify), his best result at this level coming at the Australian Open, losing in the second round to former world no. 3 and 17th seed, Ivan Ljubičić. Paire played in five ATP 250 tournaments, making it to the second round in both Stuttgart and Metz, as well as coming through qualifying and making it into the second round in the two ATP 500 tournaments he played, Barcelona and Rotterdam, the latter in which he beat compatriot, top 20 player and former world no. 6 Gilles Simon in three sets. Paire again missed out on making his first appearance in a main draw at a Masters event, losing in qualifying in both Paris (for the second time in two years), as well as in Monte Carlo. At Challenger level, Paire made it to a couple more finals, the first at the Open Prévadiès Saint–Brieuc event in March, losing to fellow country-man Maxime Teixeira, before beating Teixera later in the year to win his first Challenger title at Ropharma Challenger Brașov. Paire followed this victory with another in Salzburg just a month later, defeating Grega Žemlja in three sets in the final.

2012: First ATP Tour singles final

Benoît kicked off his 2012 season at the Chennai Open, beating French Open quarter-finalist Fabio Fognini for the loss of just one game, before falling to Israeli Dudi Sela, despite leading by a set, in the second round. Continuing his preparation for the Australian Open, Paire played at the Heineken Open in Auckland, coming through qualifying before beating former world no. 1 Juan Carlos Ferrero and 4th seed Juan Ignacio Chela to make it to his first ever quarter-final in an ATP event. Here he lost to eventual finalist Olivier Rochus in three sets.

At the Australian Open, Paire drew top twenty-five player and former world no. 9 Stan Wawrinka in the first round, falling in straight sets. Benoît next played two back-to-back ATP 250 events at the Brasil Open (losing in the first round to David Nalbandian), and a week later the Buenos Aires where he was again beaten by Stan Wawrinka. Benoît played his third clay court tournament in a row at the Mexican Open (part of the ATP 500 Series), losing in the second round to clay court specialist Nicolás Almagro, despite taking the first set. Next, Benoît competed in back-to-back ATP Masters 1000 events Indian Wells & Miami. At Indian Wells, Paire lost is in the first round to VTR Open runner-up, Carlos Berlocq, this represented Benoît's first main draw participation at this level. Despite this, Paire had to qualify in Miami, and lost in the final round of qualifying to David Goffin.

Following the North American swing, Paire returned to the clay in Casablanca, making his second quarter-final appearance of the season. Benoît resumed the clay court season in Barcelona, losing in the second round for the second year in a row. The week after Benoît made it to his first ATP World Tour singles final at the Serbian Open, part of the ATP 250 series. On his way to the final Paire knocked out the sixth seed, third seed and top seed (Pablo Andújar), before losing in the final to Andreas Seppi in straight sets. Benoît made his seventh clay-court appearance of the season in Nice as a wildcard, losing in the first round to compatriot Roger-Vasselin.

At the French Open, Benoît reached the second round for the first time in his career, losing to eventual semi-finalist David Ferrer in straight sets. Paire didn't play a warm-up event at either Queens or Halle, yet reached the third round at Wimbledon, his best performance in a Grand Slam event, beating Matthew Ebden and twenty-second seed Alexandr Dolgopolov on the way. He lost to American qualifier Brian Baker in the third round. He followed up his impressive grass-court run at Wimbledon with a semi-finalist showing at s-Hertogenbosch, losing to eventual winner David Ferrer in three sets.

On 16 July 2012, Benoît defeated eighth-seeded Bernard Tomic in straight sets in the first round of the Swiss Open. He lost against Latvian, Ernests Gulbis, in the second round. Paire entered an ATP Tour event as the number one seed for the first time in his career at the Farmers Classic in July, but lost at the first hurdle to American Michael Russell.

2013: Maiden Masters semifinal and first top 10 win

Paire started his 2013 season in promising fashion, reaching the semi-finals in his first tournament of the year in Chennai before making his 2nd ATP World Tour final at Montpellier. Playing in front of his parents, he lost in straight sets to an in-form Richard Gasquet. "I really needed them to see how I have changed and I need to keep going. I feel I am on the right track if I stay calm and focused", he said. His performance in this tournament rose him to a career-high (at the time) ranking of 38 in the world.

After a first-round exit at the Miami Masters event, Paire reached his second final of the season at the Le Gossier Challenger event in Guadeloupe. This time he prevailed after a tough 3-set battle with Sergiy Stakhovsky, claiming his third challenger level win and reaching a new career-high ranking of 33 on 1 April 2013.

At the Internazionali BNL d'Italia, Paire defeated World No. 7 Juan Martín del Potro 6–4, 7–6(7–3) to record his first career singles win over a Top 10 player and reach the singles quarterfinals of an ATP World Tour Masters 1000 tournament for the first time in his career. Paire went on to reach the semifinals where he was beaten in two tight sets by Roger Federer. At the tournament in Stockholm in October, the 6th-seeded Paire beat the 2nd-seeded Milos Raonic of Canada in the quarterfinals to reach the semifinals, where he lost to Grigor Dimitrov in three sets.

2014: Injury and comeback
Paire began his 2014 season in the Chennai Open, reaching the quarterfinals before losing to Marcel Granollers in three sets. At the Australian Open, Paire battled past Nick Kyrgios from 2 sets down in the second round to beat the Australian teenager, however, lost to Roberto Bautista Agut in straight sets in the third round. He missed every tournament in February and March due to a knee injury, including Masters 1000 events in Indian Wells and Miami. He made his return during the clay court season, first playing at the Grand Prix Hassan II, making it to the quarterfinals before losing to eventual champion Guillermo García López.

This was followed by an appearance in Monte-Carlo, losing his opening match to qualifier Albert Montañés, the same player he'd beaten in his opening match in Casablanca. A recurrence of his knee injury forced Paire to retire towards the end of his first match in Barcelona, and subsequently withdraw from the Portugal Open. He started the Madrid Masters against Andreas Seppi, however further recurrence of his knee injury forced him to retire after just two games. He withdrew from the Rome Masters to allow his knee to recover, however did start the French Open, ending a run of four consecutive defeats by beating Alejandro Falla in the first round before losing to Roberto Bautista Agut in his next match.

Paire suffered three consecutive losses during the grass court season, at queen's Club, 's-Hertogenbosch and Wimbledon respectively, followed by a further first round loss in Stuttgart. In June 2014, after he lost in the first round at Wimbledon, he said that he was happy to lose because he "hates" the tournament.

At the Rogers Cup, Paire had to make it through the qualifying draw due to his ranking having dropped to 98th in the world. He beat Falla in the first round before losing a tightly contested match against third seed Stan Wawrinka. He qualified for Cincinnati, however, lost his first round match against wildcard Steve Johnson, resulting in Paire dropping out of the top 100 for the first time since April 2012.   At the US Open, Paire made a promising start by beating 24th seed Julien Benneteau in five sets, 7–6(7–4), 5–7, 6–4, 4–6, 6–4. However, he fell in the second round to Spaniard Pablo Carreño Busta.

2015: First ATP Tour singles title and first Grand Slam fourth round
Paire (who was unseeded), won his first ATP Tour singles title in July at the Swedish Open, defeating the top three seeds, including second-seeded Tommy Robredo in the final.

Paire defeated the 2014 US Open singles runner-up and 4th seed Kei Nishikori in the 1st round of the US Open, before going on to defeat Tommy Robredo in the 3rd round of the US Open to reach the singles 4th round of a Grand Slam for the first time in his career. He lost his 4th-round match to his compatriot, Jo-Wilfried Tsonga, in straight sets.

2016: Career high top 20 ranking
At the 2016 Australian Open, although he was seeded 17th, Paire lost in the first round in three tie-breaks to American teen-aged wildcard Noah Rubin, ranked # 328 in the world.

On 19 July, Richard Gasquet withdrew from the 2016 Olympics tennis tournament because of his back injury. Gasquet would be replaced by Paire in the men's singles draw. On 9 August, Paire (seeded no.16) had two match points in the third and final set of his Olympic tournament second round match against Fabio Fognini, but Fognini ended up winning the match. Moments after being knocked out of the Olympic tournament, the French Tennis Federation booted Paire out of his country's Olympic Games squad and ordered him to leave the athletes' village for "flouting the rules" and "poor behaviour".

2017: Wimbledon fourth round
Paire entered his first ATP World Tour tournament of 2017 by playing in the Chennai Open, where he lost in the singles semifinals to the eventual champion Roberto Bautista Agut. At the Australian Open Paire lost in the third round to the eighth seed Dominic Thiem. Paire lost three other ATP World Tour singles semifinals in the first half of 2017 – Open Sud de France (where he lost to Richard Gasquet), Grand Prix Hassan II and MercedesCup (where he lost to Lucas Pouille).

Paire, who was attempting to reach his first career Grand Slam singles quarter-final, lost in straight sets in the fourth round of Wimbledon to top-seeded defending champion Andy Murray. In September, Paire (seeded no. 7) reached his first and only ATP World Tour singles final of 2017 at the Moselle Open, losing the final to the German qualifier Peter Gojowczyk in straight sets.

2018: Second Rome Masters third round 
At the 2018 Washington Open, Paire smashed his tennis rackets onto the court 7 times and was fined $16,500 for his conduct.

2019: Second and third ATP Tour singles titles, French and Wimbledon fourth rounds
At the Grand Prix Hassan II (the only ATP Tour tournament held in Africa in 2019), Paire won the second ATP Tour singles title of his career by defeating the defending champion Pablo Andújar in straight sets 6–2, 6–3 in the final held on 14 April.

At the Lyon Open, the unseeded Paire won the third ATP Tour singles title of his career. At that tournament, he defeated two seeded players – Denis Shapovalov in the quarterfinals and rising teen Félix Auger-Aliassime in the final.

At the French Open, the unseeded Paire advanced to the round of 16, where he was defeated in five sets by no.7 seed Kei Nishikori. He also advanced to the fourth round of the 2019 Wimbledon.

2020: Ninth ATP final, loss of form during COVID season
Paire started his 2020 season by representing France at the first edition of the ATP Cup. France was in Group A alongside Chile, Serbia, and South Africa. He won his first match over Nicolás Jarry of Chile. In his second match, he beat Dušan Lajović of Serbia. In his final match, he lost to Kevin Anderson of South Africa. In the end, France ended 3rd in Group A. Seeded fifth at the ASB Classic in Auckland, he reached his ninth ATP singles final and lost to compatriot Ugo Humbert. Seeded 21st at the Australian Open, he was defeated in the second round by 2018 finalist Marin Čilić.

As the top seed at the Maharashtra Open, Paire suffered a second-round loss at the hands of qualifier Roberto Marcora. In Rotterdam, he lost in the first round to Aljaž Bedene. Seeded sixth at the Open 13 Provence in Marseille, he lost in the second round to Alexander Bublik. Seeded eighth at the Dubai Championships, he fell in the second round to Richard Gasquet. The ATP tour canceled tournaments from March through July due to the COVID-19 pandemic.

When the ATP resumed tournament play in August, Paire competed at the Western & Southern Open. Instead of the tournament being held in Cincinnati, it was held in New York. He retired during his first round match against Borna Ćorić due to being unwell. Paire tested positive for COVID-19 one day prior to the start of the US Open.

Paire returned to action in September by competing at the Italian Open. He lost in the first round to Italian wildcard Jannik Sinner. At the Hamburg Open, he retired during his first-round match against Casper Ruud; he tested positive for Covid prior to the match.

2021: Olympics participation ban, Cincinnati quarterfinal, Two Major third rounds & top 65 in doubles 

Paire began his 2021 season by competing for France at the ATP Cup. France was in Group C alongside Italy and Austria. He lost his first match to Fabio Fognini. He then retired from his match against Dominic Thiem due to an elbow injury. In the end, France ended 2nd in Group C. At the Australian Open, he was eliminated in the first round by Egor Gerasimov in four sets. He blamed the loss on 'shameful' treatment of players by the tournament organizers during quarantine and associated training restrictions, describing the tournament as 'shit', 'crap', and 'grotesque'. This outburst has resulted in him being barred by France from participation in the Tokyo Summer Olympics.

Seeded second at the Córdoba Open, Paire reached the quarterfinals where he was defeated by Federico Coria. However, in doubles, he and partner, Romain Arneodo, made it to the final where they fell to Brazilian team Rafael Matos and Felipe Meligeni Alves. Seeded third in Buenos Aires, he lost in the second round to Argentinian qualifier Francisco Cerúndolo. Seeded second at the Chile Open, he was beaten in the second round by qualifier Holger Rune. At the Mexican Open in Acapulco, he lost in the first round to top seed and eventual finalist, Stefanos Tsitsipas. Seeded 23rd in Miami, he was defeated in the second round by Lorenzo Musetti.

Paire started his clay-court season by competing at the Monte-Carlo Masters. He lost in a three-hour first-round match to Jordan Thompson. Playing in Barcelona, he was eliminated in the first round by lucky loser Federico Gaio.

At the 2021 Western & Southern Open Paire reached just his second Masters 1000 quarterfinal (first was in Rome 2013) where he was defeated by eventual finalist Andrey Rublev. En route he defeated World No. 10 Denis Shapovalov, his seventh top-10 win and John Isner.

At the 2021 French Open and 2021 US Open he reached the third rounds in doubles for the first time with R. Arneodo and R. Berankis respectively which allowed him to reach his career-high of No. 65 on 8 November 2021.

2022: Loss of form, out of top 150
Paire started his 2022 season at the first edition of the Melbourne Summer Set 1. He retired during the third set of his first-round match against lucky loser Henri Laaksonen. At the Adelaide International 2, he lost in the first round to Australian wildcard and eventual champion, Thanasi Kokkinakis. Ranked 56 at the Australian Open, he reached the third round where he lost to fourth seed, Stefanos Tsitsipas, in four sets.

Seeded seventh at the Córdoba Open, Paire was eliminated in the first round by Jaume Munar. At the Argentina Open, he fell in the first round to fifth seed Dušan Lajović in three sets, despite having three match points in the second set. In Rio, he lost in the first round to Francisco Cerúndolo. At the Mexican Open, he was defeated in the first round by top seed Daniil Medvedev. Playing at the Indian Wells Masters, he was beaten in the first round by Dominik Koepfer in three sets, despite having a 6–2, 5–2 lead in the match. As the top seed at the Arizona Classic, an ATP Challenger tournament, he lost in the second round to Radu Albot. At the Miami Open, he lost in the first round to Henri Laaksonen.

Beginning his clay-court season at the Monte-Carlo Masters, Paire lost in the first round to Lorenzo Musetti.

Paire started the US Open Series at the Atlanta Open. He lost in the first round to sixth seed and eventual finalist, Jenson Brooksby. As a result, his ranking fell from No. 94 to out of the top 100 at No. 112. At the Citi Open in Washington, D.C., he got his first ATP tour victory since May by defeating Peter Gojowczyk in the first round. He was defeated in the second round by ninth seed Holger Rune.

2023
Paire started his 2023 season at the Open Nouvelle-Calédonie in Nouméa, New Caledonia. Seeded sixth, he reached the quarterfinals where he lost to eventual champion Raúl Brancaccio. At the Tenerife Challenger, he was defeated in the first round by Kaichi Uchida. At the Australian Open, he fell in the second round of qualifying to Michael Mmoh.

Playing style

Paire's style of play is characterized by its flashiness, unpredictability and at times inconsistency. The main strength of his game is his double-handed backhand, known for its speed and spin. Paire often uses topspin backhands crosscourt at great speed and acute angles to set up a powerful backhand down-the-line to finish off points. In contrast, his forehand is relatively less powerful and consistent, particularly when played on the defense, to the extent that he's been known to hit backhands inside-out.

Paire is also known for his ability and willingness to play drop shots often on both the forehand and backhand wing throughout matches. When volleying, he also favors drop over punching volleys and is famous for hitting them with extreme backspin, sometimes even causing the ball to spin back across the net. However, these drop shot attempts sometimes give opponents the advantage when they are hit too deep, causing Paire to lose the point. He is also fond of hitting between-the-legs shots, both forward and with his back facing the net.
Paire possesses a powerful but inconsistent first serve and serves-and-volleys on occasion.

Above all, Paire is known for his flashiness on the court that plays to the crowd. He is known to hit a variety of high-risk shots and trick shots, such as the frontal and back tweener, jumping tweener, drop shots that backspin towards the net and topspin backhands at extremely acute angles, even when unnecessary to win the point.

Performance timelines

Singles
Current through the 2022 US Open.

Doubles

ATP Tour career finals

Singles: 9 (3 titles, 6 runner-ups)

Doubles: 4 (1 title, 3 runner-ups)

ATP Challenger Tour and ITF Futures Tour finals

Singles: 27 (13–14)

Doubles: 3 (1–2)

Wins over top 10 players
He has a  record against players who were ranked in the top 10 at the time the match was played.

Notes

References

External links
 
 
 
 
 

1989 births
Living people
French male tennis players
Hopman Cup competitors
Sportspeople from Avignon
Olympic tennis players of France
Tennis players at the 2016 Summer Olympics